The 2022 Primera División RFEF play-offs (Playoffs de Ascenso or Promoción de Ascenso) were the final play-offs for promotion from 2021–22 Primera División RFEF to the 2022–23 Segunda División.

Venues
On 16 March 2022, Galicia was announced as the venue for the promotion play-off, initially the cities of A Coruña and Ferrol were confirmed. On 5 May, the RFEF announced Vigo as the third host city.

Format
Teams ranked second through fifth in each of the two groups will qualify for the promotion play-off, which will determine the last two promotion spots. The eight qualified teams will be drawn into two fixed brackets, each of which will contain the second and fourth place finishers from one group and the third and fifth place finishers from the other. All ties will consist of a single neutral-site match. In case of draws, an overtime period will be played; if the match is still tied following the overtime, the team which achieved a higher regular season finish will be proclaimed the winner.

Promotion play-offs

Teams

Participating teams
 Deportivo La Coruña
 Racing de Ferrol
 Rayo Majadahonda
 UD Logroñés
 Albacete
 Villarreal B
 Gimnàstic de Tarragona
 Linares

Road to the play-offs

Group 1

Group 2

First round

Qualified teams

Bracket

Matches

Semi–finals

|}

Finals

Qualified teams

|}

Promoted teams
 The two teams that were promoted to Segunda División through regular season groups and the two play–off winners are included.

Final
The winners of the two regular season groups will face off in a single-match neutral site final to determine the champion of the 2021–22 Primera División RFEF season. The match will take place at one of the stadiums designated to host the promotion play-off.

Copa del Rey Qualifiers

The following clubs have qualified for the 2022-23 Copa del Rey by virtue of their league finish:

References

External links
Royal Spanish Football Federation website

Play-offs
5
Primera Federación play-offs